Rosa Andújar, FHEA, is a Dominican-American classicist and senior lecturer at King's College London. She is an expert in ancient Greek tragedy, especially the tragic chorus, and Hellenic classicisms in Latin America.

Education 
Andújar received BAs from Wellesley and King's College, Cambridge. She completed her MA (2008) and her PhD (2011) at Princeton University. Her doctoral thesis was entitled The Chorus in Dialogue: Reading Lyric Exchanges in Greek Tragedy. It was supervised by Andrew L. Ford, Froma Zeitlin, and Bernd Seidensticker.

Career 
Andújar was the first A. G. Leventis Research Fellow in Ancient Greek Literature in the Department of Greek and Latin at University College London (2012-2016). She was appointed at King's College London in 2016 as Deputy Director of Liberal Arts and Lecturer in Liberal Arts. In 2019 she was Visiting Professor in Brazil at the Federal University of Paraná. She was the keynote speaker for the 42nd annual meeting of the Australasian Society for Classical Studies in 2021.

She is the co-editor of the Classics and the Postcolonial book series for Routledge with Justine McConnell. She is Associate Editor for Greek Literature for the American Journal of Philology, and she is on the editorial board of two Brazilian Classics journals, Nuntius Antiquus and PhaoS - Revista de Estudos Clássicos. In 2019 she was elected to the Council of the Society for the Promotion of Hellenic Studies for a three-year term.

She edited The Greek Trilogy of Luis Alfaro: Electricidad; Oedipus El Rey; Mojada, which brought together for the first time the three 'Greek' plays of Luis Alfaro, a Chicano playwright and performance artist. These plays are based on Sophocles' Electra and Oedipus, and Euripides' Medea. Alfaro's Electricidad, Oedipus El Rey, and Mojada platform the concerns of the Chicanx and wider Latinx communities in Los Angeles and New York through ancient drama. The edition won the 2020 London Hellenic Prize (formerly known as the Criticos Prize). The prize awards £10,000. Previous winners include Alice Oswald for Nobody (2019), Kamila Shamsie for Home Fire (2017), and Anne Carson for Antigonick (2012).

Publications

Books 

 (ed.) The Greek Trilogy of Luis Alfaro: Electricidad; Oedipus El Rey; Mojada (London: Methuen Drama, 2020)
 (Rosa Andújar, Konstantinos P. Nikoloutsos, eds) Greeks and Romans on the Latin American Stage (London: Bloomsbury, 2020)
 (ed.) Paths of Song: The Lyric Dimension of Greek Tragedy (Berlin: De Gruyter, 2018)

Articles and book chapters 

 'Philological Reception and the Repeating Odyssey in the Caribbean: Francisco Chofre’s La Odilea, American Journal of Philology 143.2 (Summer 2022), pp. 305-334
 Phoenician Women: "Deviant" Thebans Out of Time', Queer Euripides: Re-Readings in Greek Tragedy, edited by Sarah Olsen and Mario Telò (Bloomsbury, 2022) pp. 176-185
 'Choral Mirroring in Euripides' Phaethon, Greek Drama V: Studies in the Theatre of the Fifth and Fourth Centuries BCE, edited by C. W. Marshall and H. Marshall (Bloomsbury, 2020) pp. 101-114
 'Pedro Henríquez Ureña’s Hellenism and the American Utopia', Bulletin of Latin American Research 37.S1 (November 2018), pp. 168-180
 'Uncles ex Machina: Familial Epiphany in Euripides’ Electra''', Ramus 45.2 (December 2016), pp. 165-191
 'Revolutionizing Greek Tragedy in Cuba: Virgilio Piñera’s Electra Garrigó, The Oxford Handbook of Greek Drama in the Americas'', edited by K. Bosher, F. Macintosh, J. McConnell, and P. Rankine (Oxford, 2015) pp. 361-379

References

External links 
 King's College London Staff Profile Page: https://www.kcl.ac.uk/people/rosa-andujar
 Personal website: https://www.rosaandujar.com/
 Google Scholar Profile

Women classical scholars
American classical scholars
Hellenists
Living people
Wellesley College alumni
Alumni of King's College, Cambridge
Princeton University alumni
Year of birth missing (living people)
Fellows of the Higher Education Academy